IRIS Mist was a proposed mixed used tower which was to be built in Dubai Maritime City, in Dubai, United Arab Emirates. The tower was set to reach  in height and would have 54 floors for various purposes. It was planned to be the first development in the region to be shaped like patterned sea waves. IRIS Mist would be the tallest tower in Dubai Maritime city. The tower's facade would be built in layers of white pre-cast, aluminium and glass of varying colour and texture. It was planned to have 54 residential floors, retail outlets, and 28 units of office space. The tower was initially expected to be completed in 2011. The tower would be a green building, as its design concept included facilities to reduce use of non-renewable resources.

See also
List of tallest buildings in Dubai
Dubai Maritime City

References

Emporis.com
Ameinfo.com
Estatesdubai.com
E-architect.co.uk
Gulfnews.com
Gowealthy.com
Highbeam.com 

Proposed skyscrapers in Dubai